The Stephen Keshi Stadium is a multi-purpose complex in Asaba, Nigeria.

The main venue at the complex is the Governor Okowa Main Bowl, the football and athletics stadium. It was formerly known as Asaba township stadium, and was named after football great, Stephen Keshi. The stadium hosted the 2018 African Championships in Athletics and has a capacity of 22,000 people, all covered. It was commissioned in 2018.

References

External links
ATHLETIC CHAMPIONSHIP: OKOWA ORDERS CONSTRUCTION OF ROADS AROUND STEPHEN KESHI’S STADIUM (Delta State government site)

Asaba
Football venues in Nigeria
Delta State
Multi-purpose stadiums in Nigeria
Athletics (track and field) venues in Nigeria